Bagh Sangan-e Olya (also Romanized as Bāgh Sangān-e ‘Olyā; also known as Bāgh-e Sangān, Bāgh-e Sangān-e Bālā, Bāgh-i-Sangūn, Bāgh Sangān, and Dāq Sangān) is a village in Mian Jam Rural District, in the Central District of Torbat-e Jam County, Razavi Khorasan Province, Iran. At the 2006 census, its population was 753, in 175 families.

See also 

 List of cities, towns and villages in Razavi Khorasan Province

References 

Populated places in Torbat-e Jam County